Bahnea (Hungarian pronunciation: , until 1898 Szászbonyha; German: Bachnen) is a commune in Mureș County, Transylvania, Romania. It is composed of seven villages: Bahnea, Bernadea (Bernád), Cund (Kund; Reussdorf), Daia (Dányán), Gogan (Gógán), Idiciu (Jövedics), and Lepindea (Leppend).

It is traversed by the Târnava Mică river.

At the 2011 census, 35.1% of inhabitants were Roma, 33.3% Romanians, and 30.8% Hungarians.

See also 
 List of Hungarian exonyms (Mureș County)

References

Communes in Mureș County
Localities in Transylvania
Székely communities